Edward Stevens (September 15, 1932 – June 9, 2013) was an American competition rower and Olympic champion. 
Stevens won a gold medal in coxed eights at the 1952 Summer Olympics, as stroke of the US Naval Academy team, which rowed for the United States Olympic team in 1952.

References

1932 births
2013 deaths
American male rowers
Rowers at the 1952 Summer Olympics
Olympic gold medalists for the United States in rowing
Medalists at the 1952 Summer Olympics